Bernard G. Landry (1926 – 4 April 2014) was a French writer and screenwriter, one of the founders of the French publishing house

Works 
1952: Marcel Carné, sa vie, ses films, Jacques Vautrain
1960: Aide-mémoire pour Cécile, Éditions Denoël
1961: Le Jardin d'Olivier, Denoël
1963: L'Attente de quoi, Denoël
1992: Le Dernier écrivain, Le Temps des cerises
1996: L'Île Molle, Le Temps des cerises
2001: Judas et Marie-Madeleine : correspondance intime, Le Temps des cerises

Prizes 
 Prix des Deux Magots 1960 for Aide-mémoire pour Cécile

Filmography (selection) 
 1971:  by Roger Coggio
 1975:  by Roger Coggio

References

External links 
 Publications on Le Temps des Cerises
 L'île Molle
 Que vive la sécu!
 

Prix des Deux Magots winners
20th-century French non-fiction writers
French screenwriters
1926 births
2014 deaths